The Democratic Bloc was an association of political parties and organizations in the German Democratic Republic.

History
In parallel with the working staff of the CPSU European Advisory Commission commissioned in early 1944 to develop the exiled Communist Germany own political concept. A first draft was on 6 March 1944 on a working session of the exiled Communist Party presented by Wilhelm Florin. The guidelines developed by the Soviet concept of the future Communist Party saw as a government. After the unconditional surrender of the Wehrmacht on 8 May 1945 and the Berlin Declaration of the Commander in Chief of the four victorious powers of 5 June 1945 all political activity was prohibited in all zones of occupation. After consultation by Anton Ackermann, and Walter Ulbricht Gustav Sobottka on 4 June 1945 in Moscow allowed the Order № 2 of 10 of the Soviet Military Administration in Germany in June 1945, the formation and activity of anti-fascist parties in the Soviet Occupation Zone. With its call of 11 June 1945, the Communist Party came to Berlin as first advertised to the public and for cooperation:

In addition to the block at the zone level corresponding blocks were set up at the country level. In Brandenburg, the existing three members from the four-party anti-fascist came together to comprise the democratic unit block of Brandenburg on 28 November 1945. In Thuringia, the antifascist-democratic bloc of Thuringia was formed on 17 August 1945. In Saxony and Saxony-Anhalt was founded on 29 August 1945.

By 1946, the KPD and the Soviet occupation authorities had cajoled the Social Democrats in the eastern zone to merge with the KPD to form the Socialist Unity Party.  Ostensibly a union of equals, the SED soon became a full-fledged Communist party along lines similar to other parties in what would become the Soviet bloc.  The SED and the occupation authorities soon pressured the other parties into forming a permanent coalition under SED leadership.  This coalition presented a single, SED-dominated "unity list" in the Constitutional Assembly elections held in May 1949.  Although voters were only given the option of approving or rejecting the list in less-than-secret circumstances, official figures showed 66 percent of those turning out approved the list – by far the lowest total to which an SED-led alliance would admit during the four decades of Communist rule in East Germany.

In 1950 it was succeeded by the National Front.

Electoral history

Volkskammer elections

References 

Defunct political party alliances in Germany
History of East Germany
Popular fronts of communist states
Socialist Unity Party of Germany
Soviet occupation zone